The 8th Macondo Awards ceremony, presented by the Colombian Academy of Cinematography Arts and Sciences, honored the best audiovisual productions of 2019. It took place on November 9, 2019, at the Plaza Mayor convention and exhibition center in Medellín. The ceremony awarded 18 categories.

The film Birds of Passage won the award for Best Film.

Winners and nominees

See also

 List of Colombian films
 Macondo Awards
 2019 in film

References

External links
8th Macondo Awards at IMDb
8th Macondo Awards at Filmaffinity

2019 film awards
2019 in Colombia
Culture in Medellín